Stelling is a retailer of office and art supplies based in Copenhagen, Denmark. The company was founded in 1860 as a modest paint shop on Gammeltorv. In the early 1910s, however, it established a paint, lacquer and varnish factory at Valgårdsvej 2 in Valby. In the 1980s, the factory closed and most of the buildings were demolished. Toftegårds Plads is now located at the site. The Stelling House at the original location at Gammeltorv 6 was designed by Danish architect Arne Jacobsen and is now a heritage listed building.

History

The company traces its history back to 1860 when H. Schönwandt (b. 1862) opened a paint shop at Gammeltorv 6 in Copenhagen. After the founder's death, the company was sold to Anton Stelling (1836-1912). In 1900, Anton's sons, Walter (1869-1935) and Erwin (1870-1923) joined the company as partners. The same year, F.E. van der Aa Kühle's Lacquer Factory in Valby was acquired by the company. In 1912–14, the factory expanded with Christian Mandrup-Poulsen as architect.

Walter Stelling succeeded his father as CRO of the company in 1912. His son Olaf Stelling (b. 1909) was made a partner in 1933. After Walter Stelling's death, the company was continued by Olaf Stelling in a partnership with his mother, Signe Stelling. In 1937, the company's old headquarters at Gammeltorv 6 was replaced by a new building designed by Danish architect Arne Jacobsen. The new building became known as "the Stelling House" (in Danish: "Stellings Hus", literally "Stelling's House"). In 1991, the Stelling House was listed in the Danish registry of protected buildings and places.

References

External links
 Source

Retail companies of Denmark
Retail companies established in 1860
Danish companies established in 1860